A Hindu is an adherent of Hinduism.

Hindu may also refer to:

Places 
 Hindu, Hiiu County, a village in Emmaste Parish, Hiiu County, Estonia
 Hindu, Orissaare Parish, a village in Orissaare Parish, Saare County, Estonia
 Hindu, Salme Parish, a village in Salme Parish, Saare County, Estonia
 Hindu, the ancient Persian name of the Indus River

Publishing 
 The Hindu, an English-language newspaper published in India
 Hindu Tamil Thisai, or The Hindu (Tamil), a Tamil-language newspaper published in India
 The Hindu Group, an Indian publishing company that publishes The Hindu and the Hindu Tamil Thisai

Other uses 
 Hindu, adjective relating to the religion Hinduism
 The Hindu (film), the original title of the 1954 American film Sabaka

See also
 Hindoo (disambiguation)